Manteca may refer to:
 The Spanish word for lard

People 
 Albert Manteca (born 1988), Spanish footballer
 Jon Manteca (1967–1996), Spanish activist
 Sergio Martínez (born 1969), nicknamed "Manteca", Uruguayan former footballer

Places
 Manteca, California

Music
 Manteca (band), a Canadian jazz fusion band
 Manteca!, a 1965 album by Clare Fischer
 Manteca (album), a 1958 album by Red Garland
 "Manteca" (song), a 1947 jazz tune co-written by Dizzy Gillespie, Chano Pozo, and Gil Fuller